De Groene Amsterdammer is an independent Dutch weekly news magazine published in Amsterdam. It is one of the four independent opinion magazines in the Netherlands, alongside HP/De Tijd, Vrij Nederland and Elsevier.

History and profile
De Groene Amsterdammer was founded in 1877, making it one of the oldest Dutch news magazines still in existence. The magazine started under the name De Amsterdammer, meaning "someone (or something) from Amsterdam". In its early days green ink was used, later causing the word groene (green) to be added to its name when a second newspaper in Amsterdam was published under the same name De Amsterdammer. The name De Groene Amsterdammer became official in 1925. As its title implies the weekly is based in Amsterdam. During the German occupation between 1940 and 1945 the magazine temporarily ceased publication.

Over the course of time the magazine manifested itself in Dutch media with a wide range of subjects being published about, varying from philosophy, politics and literature to the liberal arts. De Groene Amsterdammer, unlike its name suggests, shows a keen interest in international subjects, with a network of freelance correspondents in various countries over the world.

The weekly magazine is generally considered to be intellectually left-wing and progressive.

Notable editors

 Martin van Amerongen
 Dirk Bezemer
 Anna Blaman
 Simon Carmiggelt
 Frederik van Eeden
 Henk Hofland
 Theodor Holman
 Loe de Jong
 Geert Mak
 Anil Ramdas

References

External links

1877 establishments in the Netherlands
Political magazines published in the Netherlands
Dutch-language magazines
Weekly magazines published in the Netherlands
Magazines established in 1877
Magazines published in Amsterdam
News magazines published in Europe